The 2016–17 Iowa State Cyclones men's basketball team represented Iowa State University during the 2016–17 NCAA Division I men's basketball season. The Cyclones were coached by Steve Prohm, who was in his second season. They played their home games at Hilton Coliseum in Ames, Iowa as members of the Big 12 Conference. They finished the season 24–11, 12–6 in Big 12 play to finish in a three-way tie for second place. In the Big 12 tournament, they defeated Oklahoma State, TCU, and West Virginia to win the tournament championship. As a result, they received the conference's automatic bid to the NCAA tournament. As the No. 5 seed in the Midwest region, they defeated Nevada in the First Round before losing to Purdue in the Second Round.

Previous season
The Cyclones finished the 2015–16 season 23–12, 10–8 in Big 12 play to finish in a tie for fifth place. They lost to Oklahoma in the quarterfinals of the Big 12 tournament. They received an at-large bid to the NCAA tournament where they defeated Iona and Arkansas–Little Rock to advance to the Sweet Sixteen where they lost to Virginia.

Offseason departures

Recruiting

Prep recruits

Incoming transfers

Roster

Schedule and results

|-
!colspan=12 style=| Exhibition

|-
!colspan=12 style=| Regular Season

|-
!colspan=12 style=| Big 12 Tournament

|-
!colspan=12 style=| NCAA tournament
|-

Rankings

*AP does not release post-NCAA tournament rankings

Awards and honors

 Big 12 Player of the Week

Monté Morris (November 21st)
Naz Mitrou-Long (December 19th)
Deonte Burton (February 6th)
Monté Morris (February 27th)

References

Iowa State Cyclones men's basketball seasons
Iowa State
Iowa State
Iowa State Cyc
Iowa State Cyc